The 1991 FIFA Women's World Cup Final was an association football match that took place on 30 November 1991 at Tianhe Stadium in Guangzhou, China. It was played between Norway and the United States to determine the winner of the 1991 FIFA Women's World Cup. The United States beat Norway 2–1, with two goals from Michelle Akers-Stahl, to become winners of the first ever FIFA Women's World Cup.

Background 
The final was contested by Norway, who rebounded from a stunning 4–0 defeat by host nation China PR to qualify from their group. They then dispatched Italy and historic rivals Sweden in the knockout rounds to reach the final. The other team in the final was the United States, who went undefeated throughout the competition, thrashing highly rated Germany 5–2 in the semi-final.

Route to the final

Match

Details

References

External links 
 1991 FIFA Women's World Cup at Rec.Sport.Soccer Statistics Foundation

Final
1991
Fifa World Cup Final 1991
1991
World Cup
 
1991
November 1991 sports events in Asia